Vincent Sattler (6 June 1969 – 22 December 1988) was a French professional footballer who played as a centre-back. He played for Strasbourg before dying due to a car accident at the age of 19.

Career 
Sattler signed a professional contract with Strasbourg in June 1986. In the 1987–88 season, the club achieved promotion to the Division 1 by winning the Division 2. Sattler was then a great prospect of French football. He would make a total of 40 appearances and score 6 goals for Strasbourg in his short-lived career.

Personal life and death 
On 22 December 1988, Sattler died in a car accident. He was driving on the road between the towns of Furdenheim and Ergersheim after a night spent with some of his Strasbourg teammates. After Sattler's death, the municipal stadium of Dahlenheim was named after him.

Career statistics

Honours 
Strasbourg
 Division 2: 1987–88

References

External links 
 

1969 births
1988 deaths
Footballers from Strasbourg
French footballers
Association football central defenders
RC Strasbourg Alsace players
Ligue 2 players
Ligue 1 players
Road incident deaths in France
20th-century French military personnel